Bad is the seventh studio album by the American singer and songwriter Michael Jackson. It was released on August 31, 1987, by Epic Records, nearly five years after Jackson's previous album, Thriller (1982). Written and recorded between January 1985 and July 1987, Bad was the third and final collaboration between Jackson and producer Quincy Jones, with Jackson co-producing and composing all but two tracks. Jackson notably adopted an edgy look and sound with Bad, departing from his signature groove-based style and high-pitched vocals. The album incorporates pop, rock, funk, R&B, dance, soul, and hard rock styles. Jackson also experimented with newer recording technology, including digital synthesizers and drum machines, resulting in a sleeker and more aggressive sound. Jackson wrote nine of the eleven songs on the album. Lyrical themes on the album include media bias, paranoia, racial profiling, romance, self-improvement, and world peace. The album features appearances from Siedah Garrett and Stevie Wonder.

One of the most anticipated albums of its time, Bad debuted at number one on the Billboard Top Pop Albums chart, selling over 2.25 million copies in its first week in the United States, and stayed atop for six consecutive weeks. It also reached number one in 24 other countries, including the United Kingdom, where it sold 350,000 copies in its first week and became the country's bestselling album of 1987. Nine songs from the album were released as official singles, and one as a promotional single. Six singles charted in the top ten of the US Billboard Hot 100 (Thriller had seven top ten singles) and "Another Part of Me" charted at #11, including a record-breaking five number ones: "I Just Can't Stop Loving You", "Bad", "The Way You Make Me Feel", "Man in the Mirror" and "Dirty Diana". The album was also promoted with the film, Moonwalker (1988), which included the music videos of songs from the album, including "Speed Demon", "Leave Me Alone", "Man in the Mirror" and "Smooth Criminal".

Subjected to widespread comparisons with Thriller by critics upon release, Jackson's vocal prowess and Bads rich, more polished production were particularly praised. In retrospect, the album has been lauded by critics as a staple of 1980s pop music and an extension of Jackson's influence on 21st-century music. A blockbuster release, it was the bestselling album worldwide of 1987 and 1988. By 1991, it stood as the second bestselling album of all time, behind Thriller, having sold 25 million copies worldwide. The Bad tour, which was Jackson's first solo world tour, grossed $125 million (equivalent to more than $291 million in 2021), making it the highest-grossing solo concert tour of the 1980s. Jackson performed 123 concerts in 15 countries to an audience of 4.4 million. It was also Jackson's last tour where he performed on the mainland United States.

With over 35 million copies sold worldwide, Bad is one of the best-selling albums of all time. In 2021, it was certified 11× Platinum by the Recording Industry Association of America (RIAA) in the United States. The album has been named by several publications as one of the greatest albums of all time. It was nominated for six Grammy Awards, including Album of the Year, and won Best Engineered Recording – Non Classical and Best Music Video (for "Leave Me Alone"). In 1988, Jackson received the first Billboard Spotlight Award, in recognition of the record-breaking chart success on the Billboard Hot 100. For his Bad videos and previous videos throughout the 1980s, Jackson received the MTV Video Vanguard Award. To celebrate its 25th anniversary, the documentary film, Bad 25, and album, Bad 25, were released in 2012.

Background 
Jackson's sixth solo album, Thriller, was released in 1982, and by 1984 it was certified 20 times platinum for sales of 20 million copies in the United States alone. Jackson was widely considered the most powerful African American in the history of the entertainment industry, whose popularity was comparable only to Elvis Presley in the 1950s and the Beatles in the 1960s. Jackson aimed to sell 100 million copies with his next album.

The years following Thriller were marred by Jackson's rifts with his family and the Jehovah's Witnesses, broken friendships with celebrities, and the pressure of celebrity. He also spent 1985 out of the public eye, while reports spread of eccentric behavior. According to some associates, Jackson was nervous about completing his next album. In 2017, Newsweek said "Has there ever been a more difficult album to make than Michael Jackson's Bad? [...] How the hell do you follow up Thriller? It's like following up the Bible."

Production and recording 

Bad was Jackson's final collaboration with co-producer Quincy Jones, who had produced Off the Wall and Thriller. After Jackson had written a handful of the tracks on Off the Wall and Thriller, Jones encouraged him to write more for his followup. Jones recalled: "All the turmoil [in Jackson's life] was starting to mount up, so I said I thought it was time for him to do a very honest album."

Jackson wanted to move in a new musical direction, with a harder edge and fiercer sound. According to guitarist Steve Stevens, who featured on Bad, Jackson asked about rock bands including Mötley Crüe.  Jackson began recording demos in November 1983 while recording Victory with the Jacksons. He spent much of 1985 to 1987 writing and recording at his home studio in Encino, Los Angeles, with a group of musicians and engineers including Bill Bottrell known as the "B team". The demos were brought to Westlake Studio to be finished by the "A team", with Jones and engineer Bruce Swedien. Jones said the team would stay up for days on end when they "were on a roll": "They were carrying second engineers out on stretchers. I was smoking 180 cigarettes a day."

Jackson was eager to find innovative sounds and was interested in new music technology. The team made extensive use of new digital synthesizers, including FM synthesis and the Fairlight CMI and Synclavier PSMT synthesizers. They sometimes combined synthesizers to create new sounds. Other instruments include guitars, organs, drums, bass, percussion and saxophones, washboard and digital guitars.

Work was disrupted in July 1984, when Jackson embarked on the Victory Tour with his brothers. Work resumed in January 1985 after the tour ended and after Jackson had recorded "We Are the World". In mid-1985, work paused again so Jackson could prepare for Disney's 4D film experience Captain EO, which featured an early version of the Bad song "Another Part of Me". Work resumed in August and continued until November 1986, when Jackson filmed the "Bad" music video. Recording resumed in January 1987, and the album was completed in July.

Jackson wrote a reported 60 songs, and recorded 30, wanting to use them all on a three-disc set. Jones suggested that the album be cut down to a ten-track single LP. Jackson is credited for writing all but two songs; other writing credits include Terry Britten and Graham Lyle for "Just Good Friends" and Siedah Garrett and Glen Ballard for "Man in the Mirror".

Songs

Bad 
"Bad" was recorded and written by Jackson in as late as October 1986. It features drums played by John Robinson who had previously worked with Jackson and Jones on Off the Wall (1979). According to Jackson, it was inspired by a true story that he had read about in a newspaper article about a boy who 'was from the ghetto' and went up to a private school in Upstate New York. When he came back, his friends got so jealous of him that they killed him; Jackson stated that the student's death was not included in the music video. Various Jackson biographers have concluded that the story he was referring was that of Edmund Perry. However, Perry was not killed by kids in his neighborhood; he was killed by a plainclothes police officer when Perry and his brother allegedly attacked and badly beat the officer in a mugging attempt. It was originally planned as a duet between Jackson and Prince, after producer Jones suggested they record a song together. However, Prince said in an interview with Chris Rock in 1997 that he had declined the invitation, because of disputes he had with the opening line of the song, that contained the lyrics 'Your butt is mine'. He instead offered Jackson "Wouldn't You Love To Love Me", a song he wrote, but Jackson rejected it. With "Bad", Jackson adopted an edgier, harder and different sound.

The Way You Make Me Feel 
"The Way You Make Me Feel" was developed by Jackson in 1985 with a different title, "Hot Fever". It was also solely written by him and co-produced with Jones. It features horn arrangements by Jerry Hey of Seawind and other members of the group who had worked on Off the Wall and  Thriller.

Speed Demon 
"Speed Demon" was written and co-produced by Jackson in 1986 during the  Bad recording sessions. According to Jones, Jackson wrote the song after he received a traffic ticket, which caused him to arrive late to the recording studio session. The song begins with a racing-car intro, which was proposed by Christopher Currell, who plays the synclaiver on the song; he is credited for the sound effects. Other musicians on the song include  Greg Phillinganes on synthesizer and Paulinho da Costa on percussion.

Liberian Girl 
Jackson wrote "Liberian Girl" as early as 1983 and it was originally set to be included on The Jacksons 1984 album Victory until it wasn't. Jackson then recorded the song for the album in 1986. Jackson stated in a 1987 interview, with Jet magazine, shortly after  Bad was released, that the song came up to him while he was busy "playing pinball", then he "went quickly upstairs" to put it on a tape-record, as he had always done with songs he had written. It features synthesizer played by Michael Boddicker, who had also played on several songs on Thriller and the charity single We Are the World. The Toto members, David Paich and Steve Porcaro, who had also previously worked on Thriller, provided synthesizer and synthesizer programming respectively. The song also features a Swahili chant from South African jazz singer, Letta Mbulu.

Just Good Friends 
"Just Good Friends" is one of the two songs on the album which was not written by Jackson himself. It features Stevie Wonder and was written and composed by Terry Britten and Graham Lyle, recorded in 1987. Wonder had previously worked on Off the Wall with Jackson and Jones, writing "I Can't Help It". Wonder also plays the synthesizer solo on the song.

Another Part of Me 
"Another Part of Me" was written by Jackson in 1985 for the 3D science fiction short film, Captain EO, directed by Francis Ford Coppola, which was released in 1986. "Another Part of Me" could be seen at the end of "Captain EO", as the title character and his crew triumphantly exit and fly off into space. Jackson re-recorded the song in 1986 and it was decided to include it on the Bad album.

Man in the Mirror 
"Man in the Mirror" is also one of the two songs on the Bad album which was not written by Jackson. It was written by Siedah Garrett and Glen Ballard in 1987, after Jones invited a group of songwriters to a dinner at his home, asking them to 'write hits' for Jackson's new album. Garrett came up with a line about a man looking in the mirror and Ballard came up with the melody; then they recorded a demo within a week. The song, along with "I Just Can't Stop Loving You", was recorded in May of 1987. An excited Garrett called Jones while he was in a meeting, telling him that they had come up with a good song that would be a perfect fit for the album. At Jackson's request, Ballard and Garrett wrote a longer middle eight and modified the lyrics. Jones enlisted the Andraé Crouch choir to record gospel vocals.

I Just Can't Stop Loving You 
"I Just Can't Stop Loving You" is a ballad, written by Jackson and recorded by Jackson and Garrett in May 1987. Garrett was also the one who co-wrote Man in the Mirror. According to Jones, Jackson initially wanted Whitney Houston or Barbra Streisand to sing the duet with him. Streisand took a pass on the invitation. Houston's label, Arista Records, thought it was "too risky" for her to do the collaboration, as she was in the process of promoting her then new album Whitney. It was the first time since 1979's Off the Wall that Jackson had collaborated with a female artist on a duet, which was "It's the Falling in Love" with Patti Austin. Jones produced the song with Jackson receiving co-producing credits, like on the rest of the album.

Dirty Diana 
"Dirty Diana" is a hard-rock song, written and recorded by Jackson in 1986. The last time Jackson had written a rock song was 1982's  Thriller with "Beat It". 'Dirty Diana' was noted for having lyrical themes such as the ones of  Billie Jean.  Jackson sings about a woman who "likes the boys in the band", which may be a reference to the "groupies" he had previously said liked to hang out around him and his brothers, in the early days of the Jackson Five. The song has three verses and three bridges. It has, furthermore, a guitar solo by Billy Idol's guitarist, Steve Stevens. The song's outro ends with Jackson singing "come on" into a fade with "hey baby wontcha" in the ad-lib.

Composition and lyrics 

Musically, Bad is a heavier and more "aggressive" record than Thriller, with Jackson moving away from the heavy-groove sound and high-pitched vocals, which featured on both Off the Wall and Thriller. Bad primarily incorporates pop, rock, funk and R&B, but also explores other genres such as soul and hard rock. Stephen Thomas Erlewine of AllMusic noted that Bad moved Jackson "deeper into hard rock, deeper into schmaltzy adult contemporary, deeper into hard dance – essentially taking each portion of Thriller to an extreme, while increasing the quotient of immaculate studiocraft."

The album's song lyrics relate to romance and paranoia, the latter being a recurring theme in Jackson's albums. "Bad" was originally intended as a duet between Jackson and Prince (and Jackson had also planned duets with Diana Ross, Whitney Houston, Aretha Franklin and Barbra Streisand). The song was viewed as a revived "Hit the Road Jack" progression with lyrics that pertain to boasting. "Dirty Diana" was viewed by AllMusic's Stephen Thomas Erlewine as misogynistic and its lyrics describing a sexual predator do not aim for the "darkness" of "Billie Jean", instead sounding equally intrigued by and apprehensive of a sexual challenge, while having the opportunity to accept or resist it. "Leave Me Alone" was described as a "paranoid anthem". "Man in the Mirror" was seen as Jackson going "a step further" and offering "a straightforward homily of personal commitment", which can be seen in the lyrics, "I'm starting with the man in the mirror / I'm asking him to change his ways / And no message could have been any clearer / If you wanna make the world a better place / Take a look at yourself and then make a change."

The lyrics to "Liberian Girl" were viewed as "glistening" with "gratitude" for the "existence of a loved one," while those to "Smooth Criminal" recalled "the popcorn-chomping manner" of "Thriller". The track was thought of as an example of "Jackson's free-form language" that keeps people "aware that we are on the edge of several realities: the film, the dream it inspires, the waking world it illuminates". The music in "I Just Can't Stop Loving You", a duet with Siedah Garrett, consisted mainly of finger snaps and timpani. "Just Good Friends" is a duet with Stevie Wonder; Jones admitted later: "I made a mistake with ['Just Good Friends']. That didn't work."

Jackson's mother, Katherine Jackson, wanted him to write an R&B song with a shuffle rhythm for the album, which came to be "The Way You Make Me Feel". The song consists of blues harmonies and a jazz-like tone, comparable to the classic Motown sound of the 1960s. The lyrics of "Another Part of Me" deal with being united, as "we". Critics Richard Cromelin (from the Los Angeles Times) and Richard Harrington (from The Washington Post) associated the song's lyrics with the Harmonic Convergence phenomenon that occurred around the time of the album's release, with Harrington highlighting the verse: "The planets are lining up / We're bringing brighter days / They're all in line / Waiting for you / Can't you see? / You're just another part of me".

Release and commercial reception 
Bad was released on August 31, 1987. A writer for the Miami Herald reflected back on the anticipation for Bad, describing the album's release as being the "most hotly anticipated album in history". Michael Goldberg and David Handelman had predicted that "If Bad sells 'only' 10 million copies, that will be more than virtually any other record but could be viewed as a failure for Michael Jackson".

Within just a year of its release, Bad was established as a blockbuster; the San Jose Mercury News stated that it was the bestselling album worldwide of 1987, while the International Federation of the Phonographic Industry (IFPI) certified it as also the bestselling album worldwide of 1988 having sold 17 million copies that year. At the beginning of 1989, the album had sold 20 million copies. On account of these sales, the IFPI also certified Jackson as the top selling artist worldwide of 1988. By 1991 the album was the second-best-selling album of all time, behind Thriller, having sold 25 million copies worldwide.

In the United States, Bad debuted at number one on the Billboard Top Pop Albums chart, selling over 2.25 million copies in its first week, which made it the fastest-selling album in US history at the time. It remained there for six consecutive weeks. At the beginning of November 1987, the album had sold 3.7 million copies in the US. By mid-1988, the Recording Industry Association of America (RIAA) certified Bad for sales of 6 million copies. While, the album was a huge commercial success across the globe, its failure to match the sales of Thriller in the US caused some in the media to label the album a disappointment. In 2021, it was certified 11× platinum by the RIAA.

Worldwide, the album reached number one in 25 countries, including Austria, Canada, Japan, New Zealand, Norway, Sweden, Switzerland and the UK. It also charted at No. 13 in Mexico and at No. 22 in Portugal. Bad sold 7 million copies worldwide in its first week and 18 million copies in its first year. In the UK, Bad debuted at number one on the UK Albums Chart, selling 350,000 copies in its first-week, a record by that time. Bad shifted 1.6 million copies under four months in UK, the following year Bad sold 980,000 copies and it also was third best selling album in 1989. It was the country's bestselling album of 1987. In the UK, Bad certified 14 times platinum with sales of 4.2 million, making it Jackson's second bestselling album there. It was certified seven times platinum for the shipment of over 700,000 copies in Canada by the Canadian Recording Industry Association.

In Europe, the 2001 reissue was certified platinum by the IFPI for the sales of one million units. The album was also certified platinum by the IFPI for the shipment of over 20,000 copies in Hong Kong. Globally, Bad remains Jackson's second bestselling album, with sales of over 35 million copies.

Promotion 

The marketing strategy for Bad was modeled on that for Thriller. Like the first Thriller single, "The Girl Is Mine", the first Bad single, "I Just Can't Stop Loving You", was a ballad duet, followed by two "more obvious modern pop knockouts" backed by music videos.

A commemorative special on Jackson's life, The Magic Returns, aired on CBS during prime time on the day of the release of Bad. At the end of the documentary, the channel debuted the short film for "Bad", directed by Martin Scorsese and featuring Wesley Snipes. The marketing strategy, mastered by DiLeo among others, also included Jackson producing another mini-movie around the time of the Bad world tour. That film, Moonwalker (1988), included performances of songs from Bad, including "Speed Demon", "Leave Me Alone", "Man in the Mirror" and "Smooth Criminal", the latter two released as sole videos at the end of the film. The film also included the music video for "Come Together", with the song featuring seven years later on HIStory: Past, Present and Future, Book I. It became the bestselling home video of all time.

Sponsored by Pepsi, the Bad tour began in Japan, marking Jackson's first performances there since 1972 with the Jackson 5. Attendance figures for the first 14 dates in Japan totaled a record-breaking 450,000. Jackson performed seven sold-out shows at Wembley Stadium, beating the previous record held by Madonna, Bruce Springsteen and Genesis. The third concert on July 16, 1988, was attended by Diana, Princess of Wales and Prince Charles. Jackson was entered into the Guinness World Records three times from the tour alone. The Bad tour was a major financial success, grossing $125 million. Jackson performed 123 concerts in 15 countries to an audience of 4.4 million.

Singles 

"I Just Can't Stop Loving You", a duet with Siedah Garrett, was the lead single. It peaked at number one on the Billboard Hot 100 and also reached number one in Belgium, Canada, Ireland, the Netherlands, Norway, Spain, the UK and Zimbabwe.

"Bad" reached number one on the Billboard Hot 100, and remained there for two weeks, becoming the album's second number-one single, and Jackson's eighth number one entry on the chart. It also peaked at number one on the Hot R&B Singles, Hot Dance Club Play and Rhythmic chart. Internationally, the song was also commercially successful, charting at the top of the charts in seven other countries including Ireland, Italy, Norway, Spain, and the Netherlands.

"The Way You Make Me Feel" was the third consecutive Billboard Hot 100 number-one and reached number one in Ireland and Spain. "Man in the Mirror" reached number one on the Billboard Hot 100 and in Canada and Italy. Jackson performed both songs at the 1988 Grammy Awards. It was nominated for Record of the Year at the next year's 1989 Grammy Awards.

"Dirty Diana" was the record-breaking fifth Billboard Hot 100 number-one single from Bad. Before the start of the Wembley Stadium show during the Bad tour in 1988, Diana, Princess of Wales, who was in attendance, informed Jackson that it was one of her favorite songs.

"Another Part of Me" achieved less success, reaching number 11 on the Billboard Hot 100, but topped the R&B Singles Chart. Like Jackson's earlier songs in his career such as "Can You Feel It" and "We Are the World", the lyrics of the song emphasize global unity, love and outreach.

"Smooth Criminal" became the sixth top 10 single on the Billboard Hot 100, peaking at number seven. The song reached number one in Belgium, Iceland, the Netherlands and Spain. Though it was not one of the Billboard Hot 100 number-one singles, in retrospective reviews it has been regarded as one of the best songs on Bad and one of Jackson's signature songs.

Released outside the United States and Canada, "Leave Me Alone" topped the Irish charts and reached the top ten in five other countries. "Leave Me Alone" was Jackson's response to negative and exaggerated rumors about him that frequently appeared in the tabloids post-1985 after the success of Thriller. The music video was the recipient of Best Music Video at the 1990 Grammy Awards.

The album's final single, "Liberian Girl", did not chart on the Billboard Hot 100, but reached the top 20 in various countries and reached number one in Ireland. The song has been sampled and covered by various artists including Chico Freeman, 2Pac and MC Lyte.

Bad became the first album to have five consecutive singles peak at number one on the Billboard Hot 100. In 2011, the record was tied by American singer Katy Perry's Teenage Dream. In the UK, seven of the Bad singles reached the UK top ten which was a record for any studio album for over 20 years.

Covers 
In 1988, "Weird Al" Yankovic recorded "Fat", a parody of "Bad", which won a Grammy Award for Best Concept Music Video at the 1989 Grammy Awards.

Critical reception 

Davitt Sigerson from Rolling Stone wrote that "even without a milestone recording like 'Billie Jean', Bad is still a better record than Thriller." He believed the filler, such as "Speed Demon", "Dirty Diana" and "Liberian Girl", made Bad "richer, sexier and better than Thriller's forgettables." Despite this, Rolling Stone commented that "the best way to view" Bad was not as "the sequel to Thriller. In a contemporary review for The New York Times, Jon Pareles called Bad "a well-made, catchy dance record by an enigmatic pop star". He said while nothing on the record compared to "Wanna Be Startin' Somethin'", the music's "concocted synthesizer-driven arrangements" were "clear" and carried "a solid kick". In USA Today, Edna Gundersen called it Jackson's "most polished effort to date", that is "calculated but not sterile".

The Village Voice critic Robert Christgau also praised the album. While he felt album's "studio mastery" and Jackson's "rhythmic and vocal power" made for "the strongest and most consistent black pop album in years", he lamented its lack of "genius" in the vein of "Beat It" or "Billie Jean" and panned the lyrical themes: "He's against burglary, speeding, and sex ('Dirty Diana' is as misogynistic as any piece of metal suck-my-cock), in favor of harmonic convergence and changing the world by changing the man in the mirror. His ideal African comes from Liberia. And he claims moonwalking makes him a righteous brother. Like shit."

Richard Harrington of The Washington Post felt that while the album could not live up to post-Thriller expectations, it would be "considerably fairer to compare" Bad with Off the Wall. His overall opinion on Bad was that it was "a very good record" that is "immaculately produced and with some scintillating vocal performances from Jackson". Richard Cromelin of the Los Angeles Times called Bad "a fair-to-strong array of soul and rock blends", commenting that the record was "not bad" and was more "reminiscent of Off the Walls uniform strength than Thrillers peaks and valleys". Cromelin felt that it would be "disappointing" if this album's "creative level" is where Jackson wants to stay.

In 1988, Bad was nominated for Grammy Awards for Album of the Year, Best Pop Vocal Performance – Male, Best R&B Vocal Performance – Male, and won for Best Engineered Recording – Non Classical. The following year, it was nominated for Record of the Year for "Man in the Mirror", and in 1990 won for Best Music Video – Short Form (for "Leave Me Alone"). "Bad" won an American Music Award for Favorite Soul/R&B Song at the 1988 American Music Awards. At the 1988 Soul Train Music Awards, the album won Best R&B/Soul Album – Male and "Bad" won Best R&B/Soul Single – Male. The following year, "Man in the Mirror" also won Best R&B/Soul Single – Male. At the 1989 Brit Awards, "Smooth Criminal" won British Video of the Year. Following the appraisal of the music videos of the singles from Bad, along with his previous music videos throughout the 1980s, Jackson was awarded the MTV Video Vanguard Award.

In 2009, The Daily Telegraph commented that while Bad was another worldwide commercial success, the album "inevitably failed to match the success of Thriller despite Jackson's massive and grueling world tour". In the same year, VH1 said that the expectations for Bad were "ridiculously high", noting that there was also further hype after Jackson planned duets with the likes of Prince; Whitney Houston; Aretha Franklin and Barbra Streisand. VH1 credited Bad for being a "deeply personal project" for Jackson – he wrote nine of the 11 songs – and one that saw him gain further independence and debut a harder-edged look and sound.

Legacy and influence

Reappraisals 

Bad has been credited as defining the sound of "late-80s' pop", along with Madonna's Like a Prayer (1989) and Janet Jackson's Rhythm Nation 1814 (1989) according to Newsweek. The album further set the standard for innovation in music videos following the success of the music videos for "Bad", "Smooth Criminal", "The Way You Make Me Feel" and "Leave Me Alone". In a retrospective review for BBC Music, Mike Diver regarded Bad as a landmark of 1980s pop culture: "A multi-million-unit-shifter, Bad was (and remains) as important to 1980s pop culture as the rise of the Walkman, the Back to the Future movies, and the shooting of JR. Like 1982's Thriller, it's an album that appeared to easily find a home within the record collection of rockers and poppers, punks and poets alike." Diver also praised the album for being the "best of the best [of its time]" and an "essential pop masterpiece". Writing for Billboard, Gail Mitchell wrote that Bad is "one of the most important pop albums of the late '80s, and one of the most successful albums in Billboard chart history".

In 2009, Jim Farber of the Daily News wrote that Bad "streamlined the quirks" of Jackson's two previous albums to "create his most smooth work of pop to date". Writing for The Root, Matthew Allen claimed that Bad was the start of Jackson's three-year "prime" in his "vocals, songwriting, producing, performing and video output". Allen also regarded the album as "[doubling] down on the edge" of Thriller in both subject matter and instrumental arrangement. Writing for Albumism, Chris Lacy considered Bad possibly being superior to Off the Wall and Thriller: "Comparisons with Off the Wall and Thriller are unimportant, except for this one: Bad is a pure pop masterpiece that stands parallel with—and, at times, eclipses—its classic predecessors." Lacy also stated that Bad set a "new gold standard for pop music and entertainment". In an article titled '"Bad": Better than "Thriller", Annie Zalski of Salon said that Bad compares very favorably to Thriller, describing the album as far more "muscular and sculpted".

Joseph Vogel was also enthusiastic about the record. "On Bad, Jackson's music is largely about creating moods, visceral emotions, and fantastical scenarios....[with] each song work[ing] as a dream capsule, inviting the listener into a vivid new sound, story, space." He called Bad "a compelling, phantasmagorical album, which a handful of critics recognized from the beginning." According to Jayson Rodriguez of MTV, "following the twin cannons that were Off the Wall and Thriller wouldn't be an easy task for most, but Jackson's follow-up, 1987's Bad, was formidable by all accounts." Rodriguez also felt that Bad  was "wrongfully dismissed by critics because it wasn't the sales blockbuster that Thriller was" and that during the Bad era, Jackson's vocal hiccups and stammered "shamone" would become staples in his music that were "heightening and highlighting the emotion of his lyrics." Erika Ramirez of Billboard highlighted "Another Part of Me" and "Man in the Mirror" for showcasing Jackson as a "caring humanitarian" and emphasizing world unity.

21st-century appeal 
Twenty-five years after its release, the filmmaker Spike Lee said that Bad sounds the "freshest" compared to other Billboard 200 number-one albums released in 1987, such as U2's The Joshua Tree, Bruce Springsteen's Tunnel of Love and Whitney Houston's Whitney: "Go to the charts ... and see what were the top albums 25 years ago, play those albums now and then play Bad, and then see which one still sounds fresh and doesn't sound dated." Reflecting in 2022, 35 years after its release, Marcus Floyod wrote for Renowned for Sound that "you can still hear why Bad was the singer's [Jackson] second best selling album [...] Bad will always be a fan favourite and one of Michael Jackson's most influential and ear-tantalising albums released over his extraordinary career."

Following the 30th anniversary of the album's release, Kendall Fisher of E! Online regarded it as having an impact on contemporary artists; "Essentially, [Bad] epitomized the massive influence [Jackson] had on many of today's biggest artists." The American musician Kanye West claimed that Jackson's outfit in the "Bad" video is "far more influential" than Jackson's outfit in the "Thriller" video. West also said "I almost dress like that [Jackson's outfit in the "Bad" video] today." The American rapper Ludacris, who featured in the Canadian singer Justin Bieber's song "Baby", said that the "Baby" music video was intended to be "a 2010 version" of "The Way You Make Me Feel". MTV noted that the choreography used "a few of Jackson's less-suggestive moves".

Rankings 
In 2003, Bad was ranked number 202 on Rolling Stone's list of the 500 Greatest Albums of All Time, 203 in a 2012 revised list, and 194 in a 2020 list. In NMEs The 500 Greatest Albums of All Time list, Bad was ranked number 204. It was also included in the book titled 1001 Albums You Must Hear Before You Die. In 2009, VH1 listed Bad at number 43 on their list of 100 Greatest Albums of All Time of the MTV Generation. In 2012, Slant Magazine ranked the album at number 48 on its list of The 100 Best Albums of the 1980s. Billboard ranked Bad at number 138 on its list of the Greatest of All Time Billboard 200 Albums. It was ranked number 30 in Billboards list of the Greatest of All Time R&B/Hip-Hop Albums, out of 100 albums. Billboards critics ranked it the 41st best album on its list of all 92 diamond-certified albums.

Accolades

Bad 25 

It was announced on May 3, 2012, that Jackson's estate and Epic Records would be releasing a 25th anniversary album of Bad. The album was named Bad 25 and was released on September 18, 2012. Since the release of Bad 25, there has been a discontinuation of the 2001 special edition.

Track listing 
All tracks are produced by Quincy Jones and co-produced by Michael Jackson.

Notes
Re-issues of Bad feature a number of changes when compared to the original 1987 release:
"Bad" – The original mix was replaced with the 7" single mix. The most notable difference is the lack of horns in all the choruses except for the last two. Horns are also missing from the second and third pre-choruses. The rhythm guitar during the choruses is also turned up along with the hi-hats.
"The Way You Make Me Feel" – The full-length remix used for the single with louder vocals and ad libs added to the end replaced the original album mix.
"I Just Can't Stop Loving You" omits Jackson's spoken intro.
"Dirty Diana" is replaced with the single edit of the song.
"Smooth Criminal" went through two changes on the album. It was remixed to make the kick drum heavier and the bass synth fatter. The quick-sequenced synclavier behind the bass has been rendered mono as well. The first version of this mix left the breathing intact, but was later removed after some time.

Personnel 
Personnel as listed in the album's liner notes are:
Lead and backing vocals: Michael Jackson
Background vocals: Siedah Garrett (tracks 7–8), The Winans (7), and The Andraé Crouch Choir (7)
Bass guitar: Nathan East (track 8)
Hammond organ: Jimmy Smith (track 1)
Drums: John Robinson (tracks 1–4, 9–10), Miko Brando (3), Ollie E. Brown (3, 5), Leon "Ndugu" Chancler (8), Bill Bottrell (10), Bruce Swedien (5, 10), Humberto Gatica (5)
Programming: Douglas Getschal (tracks 1–4, 9), Cornelius Mims (5), Larry Williams (11)
Guitar: David Williams (tracks 1–3, 6, 9–10), Bill Bottrell (3), Eric Gale (2), Danny Hull, Steve Stevens (solo, 9), Dann Huff (7–8), Michael Landau (5), Paul Jackson Jr. (6, 9, 11)
Trumpet: Gary Grant, Jerry Hey (tracks 1–3, 5–6, 10)
Sounds engineered: Ken Caillat and Tom Jones
Percussion: Paulinho da Costa (tracks 1–5, 8), Ollie E. Brown (2, 7)
Keyboards: Stefan Stefanovic, Greg Phillinganes (track 7)
Saxophone: Kim Hutchcroft (tracks 1–3, 5–6, 10), Larry Williams (1–2, 5–6, 10)
Synclavier (tracks 1–6, 8–10), digital guitar (1), finger snaps (2), sound effects (3): Christopher Currell
Synthesizer: John Barnes (tracks 1–4, 6, 9–10), Michael Boddicker (1–5, 9–10), Greg Phillinganes (1–3, 5, 8, 11, solo–1), Rhett Lawrence (5–6), David Paich (4, 8), Larry Williams (4–5, 11), Glen Ballard (7), Randy Kerber (7), Randy Waldman (9)
Piano: John Barnes (track 8), Kevin Maloney (10)
Rhythm arrangement: Michael Jackson (tracks 1–4, 6, 9–11), Quincy Jones (1, 3–5, 7–8), Christopher Currell (1), John Barnes (4, 6, 9–10), Graham Lyle (5), Terry Britten (5), Glen Ballard (7), Jerry Hey (9)
Horn arrangement: Jerry Hey (tracks 1–3, 5–6, 10)
Programming: Larry Williams (track 2), Eric Persing (3), Steve Porcaro (4, 8), Casey Young (11)
Midi saxophone: Larry Williams (track 3)

Charts

Weekly charts

Year-end charts

Decade-end charts

Certifications and sales

See also 

Bad (tour)
Bad 25
List of best-selling albums
List of best-selling albums in Austria
List of best-selling albums in Brazil
List of best-selling albums in France
List of best-selling albums in Germany
List of best-selling albums in Italy
List of best-selling albums in the United Kingdom
List of best-selling albums in the United States
List of Top 25 albums for 1987 in Australia
List of Billboard 200 number-one albums of 1987
List of number-one albums of 1987 (Canada)
List of number-one albums from the 1980s (New Zealand)
List of UK Albums Chart number ones of the 1980s
Michael Jackson albums discography
Even Worse

Notes

References

Citations

Works cited

External links 

1987 albums
Michael Jackson albums
CBS Records albums
Epic Records albums
Albums arranged by Quincy Jones
Albums produced by Michael Jackson
Albums produced by Quincy Jones
Albums recorded at Westlake Recording Studios
Grammy Award for Best Engineered Album, Non-Classical